The 1967–68 Cheshire County Football League was the 44th in the history of the Cheshire County League, a football competition in England.

League table

References

1967–68 in English football leagues
Cheshire County League